Morne Rouge or Morne-Rouge may refer to:

 Morne Rouge, Grenada, a town in Saint George Parish, Grenada
 Morne-Rouge, Martinique, a commune in the French overseas department of Martinique
 Morne Rouge, Saint Barthélemy, a quartier of Saint Barthélemy (named after the mountain of the same name)

See also

 Morne (disambiguation)
 Rouge (disambiguation)
 Rougemont (disambiguation) and Rougemount (Redmount/Redmont)